Elie Walter Martel (born November 26, 1934) is a former politician in Ontario, Canada. He served in the Legislative Assembly of Ontario from 1967 to 1987, as a member of the New Democratic Party (NDP).

Personal life
Martel was born in Capreol, Ontario, into a French speaking family and was educated at an English-speaking boarding school that forced him to stop speaking his family's native language. He quit school three times to work on the railroad, and at Inco. He finally completed secondary school and then went to Laurentian University to major in history. After university, he went to North Bay Teacher's College. He worked as a teacher and high school principal in the Sudbury area before entering politics.

His wife Gaye is the daughter of Norman Fawcett, who was Nickel Belt's federal Member of Parliament from 1965 to 1968.

Career in politics

He was first elected to the Ontario legislature in the 1967 election, defeating Progressive Conservative candidate Cecil Fielding by 1,200 votes in the Northern Ontario constituency of Sudbury East.  His victory happened the same year that the United Steelworkers absorbed INCO's International Union of Mine, Mill, and Smelter Workers union local 598, ending almost 20 years of very bitter political infighting between the unions and the CCF/NDP. The infighting ousted former CCF MPP, Bob Carlin because the party feared the Sudbury riding association was controlled by communists in the Mine, Mill union. Only after the Steelworkers' prolonged takeover of Mine, Mill, did the NDP finally have unity between its warring factions, thereby allowing Martel to win the seat.

In 1974, Martel supported the striking uranium miners at Elliot Lake who were demanding improved safety and support from employers.

Early in his career, Martel navigated a motion through an NDP provincial convention supporting full funding for Catholic high schools. He was re-elected by comfortable margins in the elections of 1971, 1975, 1977, 1981 and 1985, and served as an opposition member for his entire legislative career. Martel was House Leader of the NDP for seven years, from 1978-1985.  He stepped down from that position after being left-off the NDP's negotiating team that eventually brokered the accord between the Liberals and the NDP to form a stable minority government in May 1985. NDP leader Bob Rae thought that Martel was "too much of a lone wolf," to negotiate the deal.

He was on the left-wing of the New Democratic Party, and was strongly supported by its trade-union base.  Along with other NDP legislators from the Sudbury area, he frequently called for Inco's nickel mine in the city to be nationalized.

Martel encouraged Bob Rae to seek the provincial NDP leadership in 1981, but began developing his own organization when Rae delayed his entry. He eventually withdrew from the contest to support Rae's candidacy, but his personal and professional relationship with Rae deteriorated when the campaign was over.  By some accounts, the two men strongly disliked one another on a personal level.

Retirement

Martel stood down as a Member of Provincial Parliament (MPP) in 1987, and was succeeded in Sudbury East by his daughter Shelley Martel after a bitter battle for the riding's NDP nomination between her and Rev. William Major.  Shortly after his retirement, Martel was named vice-chair of the Environmental Assessment Board by Liberal Premier of Ontario David Peterson.

The NDP won their first ever majority government in the 1990 provincial election, and Shelley Martel was subsequently named as a prominent cabinet minister. The journalist Thomas Walkom has argued that Elie Martel pressured Rae to keep his daughter in cabinet following a scandal in 1991.

Martel ran as a candidate of the federal New Democratic Party in the 1997 federal election, but finished second to Liberal incumbent Ray Bonin in Nickel Belt.

Sudbury East was disbanded and merged with the provincial Nickel Belt electoral district for the 1999 provincial election. Shelley Martel continued to represent that constituency provincially until her retirement in 2007, ending the family's forty-year run of representing the greater Sudbury area. She is married to Howard Hampton, former leader of the Ontario New Democrats.

References

External links
 

1934 births
Living people
Ontario New Democratic Party MPPs
New Democratic Party candidates for the Canadian House of Commons
Franco-Ontarian people
Politicians from Greater Sudbury
Laurentian University alumni
Nipissing University alumni